"S.O.S (The Tiger Took My Family)" is a song recorded by Swedish Eurodance artist Dr. Bombay. It was released in 1998 as the second single from his debut album, Rice & Curry (1998). The song was a top 10 hit in Norway and Sweden (number two), while reaching the top 20 in Finland.

Content
The song has a humorous theme and is sung from the perspective of Dr. Bombay, a snake charmer and mystic whose peaceful life in the outskirts of rural Calcutta is interrupted when a vicious tiger begins abducting members of his family.

Track listing
The following tracks were released on the maxi single:
S.O.S. (The Tiger Took My Family) (Original Version) – 3:27
S.O.S. (The Tiger Took My Family) (Extended Ravi-Dance Version) – 4:43
S.O.S. (The Tiger Took My Family) (Instrumental - Be Your Own Dr. Version) – 3:27
S.O.S. (The Tiger Took My Family) (S.O.S. Shaky Snake Meditation) – 2:51

Music video
An accompanying music video for the song was produced in 1998. The video opens with an introduction to Dr. Bombay's family and their peaceful life in the outskirts of Calcutta, followed by a montage of each family member running in terror from the performer dressed as the tiger. The rest of the video follows Dr. Bombay pursuing the tiger through the jungle while armed with a slingshot. He's seen swinging on vines, running in place in front of a green screen and unwittingly shooting hikers and travellers as he desperately searches for the tiger. The video ends with the eventual defeat of the tiger and the rescuing of the family.

Other media
A cover version of the song was included in the rhythm game, Samba de Amigo Ver. 2000, as well as the game's soundtrack release.

The pilot episode of the Japanese anime Popee the Performer, entitled "Popee the Clown", uses this song as background music.

"S.O.S" was licensed for inclusion in the music game Beatmania IIDX 2nd Style.

Charts

References

1998 singles
1998 songs
Dr. Bombay songs
English-language Swedish songs
Songs written by Robert Uhlmann (composer)